Troides vandepolli, the van de Poll's birdwing, is a montane birdwing butterfly occurring on Java and Sumatra. It is endemic for Indonesia and is protected by the Convention on International Trade in Endangered Species (CITES).

The species was named for Jacob R. H. Neervoort van de Poll.

Description

Troides vandepolli is sexually dimorphic.

Male: The forewings' ground colour is black. The veins are lightly bordered by white. The underside of the forewings is dark brown. The veins are bordered by white. The hindwings are black. There is a large golden-yellow area in the discal and postdiscal part. The veins are black and they cleave the golden area.

The underside is similar to the upperside. At the inner edge there is a yellowish spot.

The abdomen is brown, the underside is yellow and black. Head and thorax are black. The nape has a red hair coat.

Female: The female is larger than the male. The ground colour of the female is brown. The veins are bordered by white. There is a yellow area with dark veins on the hindwings only and a chain of black spots in the yellow area. The underside is similar to the upperside.

Taxonomy
There are three subspecies, the nominate, honrathiana Martin, 1892 (montane plateau of Sumatra) and parrottei Deslisle, 1989 (S. Sumatra; Mt Dempo). They are named for Eduard Honrath and R.E.Parrott.

Biogeographic realm
Indomalayan realm (Sundaland).

Related species
Troides vandepolli is a member of the Troides haliphron species group. The members of this clade are:

Troides haliphron (Boisduval, 1836)
Troides darsius (Gray, [1853])
Troides vandepolli (Snellen, 1890)
Troides criton (C. & R. Felder, 1860)
Troides riedeli (Kirsch, 1885)
Troides plato (Wallace, 1865)
Troides staudingeri (Röber, 1888)

References

D'Abrera, B. (1975) Birdwing Butterflies of the World. Country Life Books, London.
Haugum, J. & Low, A.M. 1978-1985. A Monograph of the Birdwing Butterflies. 2 volumes. Scandinavian Press, Klampenborg; 663 pp.
Kurt Rumbucher and Oliver Schäffler, 2004 Part 19, Papilionidae X. Troides III. in Erich Bauer and Thomas Frankenbach Eds. Butterflies of the World. Keltern: Goecke & Evers 
Other literature at Troides

External links

Troides vandepolli at Ngypal
Butterflycorner.net Images from Naturhistorisches Museum Wien (English and German)
Western Java Rain Forests Ecoregion
Sumatran montane rain forests

Vandepolli
Butterflies of Indonesia
Endemic fauna of Indonesia
Butterflies described in 1890